Demi-soeur is a 2013 French comedy film directed by Josiane Balasko and starring Balasko and Michel Blanc.

Plot 
Nenette is a lady who has the mental age of an eight year old. After the death of her mother, she leaves on a search of her father, but ends up meeting her half brother Paul, a pharmacist surly.

Cast 

 Josiane Balasko as Antoinette Novack
 Michel Blanc as Paul Bérard
 Brigitte Roüan as Véronique
 Françoise Lépine as Françoise
 George Aguilar as Silver
 Christine Murillo as Madame Lefèvre
 Grégoire Baujat as Maxime
 Sarah Suco as Too Much
 Jean-Yves Chatelais as Patrick Régnier
 Stéphan Wojtowicz as Master Bonvallet
 Chantal Banlier as Madame Lavreau
 Cléo Revel / Madeleine Revel as Lilas
 Souria Adèle as Yvonne
 Daniel-Jean Colloredo as The Monk
 Kader Boukhanef as Monsieur Belkhri

References

External links

2013 films
2013 comedy films
French comedy films
2010s French-language films
Films directed by Josiane Balasko
2010s French films